Metin Bostancıoğlu (born 1942 in Bafra, Samsun) is a Turkish politician.

Biography 
Completing secondary education at Sinop University, Bostancıoğlu chose Ankara University Faculty of Law. He started to work as a lawyer in Ankara Bar by doing lawyer and legal counsel. 20th and 21st semester Sinop Vice President Bostancıoğlu was appointed as the DSP Group Presidency of the Grand National Assembly of Turkey. The Parliamentary Harmonization Commission is also a member of the Constitutional Commission. In 2002 he was the founder of YTP, separated from DSP. Since 2012, he is a member of the Board of Auditors of Turkish Law Institution.

References 

1942 births
Living people
Ministers of National Education of Turkey
People from Bafra
Ankara University Faculty of Law alumni
20th-century Turkish lawyers